Lech Stefan Kuropatwiński (4 July 1947 – 20 December 2022) was a Polish politician. He was elected to Sejm on 25 September 2005, getting 6,115 votes in 5 Toruń district as a candidate of the Self-Defence of the Republic of Poland list.

Kuropatwiński was also a member of Sejm from 2001 to 2005. He had been the leader of Self-Defence of the Republic of Poland from 2012.

See also
Members of Polish Sejm 2005-2007

References

External links
Lech Kuropatwiński - parliamentary page - includes declarations of interest, voting record, and transcripts of speeches.

1947 births
2022 deaths
People from Włocławek County
Members of the Polish Sejm 2005–2007
Members of the Polish Sejm 2001–2005
Self-Defence of the Republic of Poland politicians